Jimmy Woods (born October 29, 1934 in St. Louis, Missouri; died March 29, 2018 in Anchorage, Alaska) was an American jazz alto saxophonist.

Woods played with the R&B band of Homer Carter in 1951, and served in the Air Force from 1952 to 1956. He played with Roy Milton after his discharge, and was with Horace Tapscott in 1960 and Joe Gordon in 1961. Following this he played with Gerald Wilson (1963)  and Chico Hamilton (1964-1965).

Woods is remembered primarily for two albums he released on Contemporary Records in the early 1960s. The second of these albums, Conflict, featured Elvin Jones, Harold Land, Carmell Jones, Andrew Hill, and George Tucker.

Discography

As a leader
Awakening!! (Contemporary, 1962)
Conflict (Contemporary, 1963)

As a sideman
With Teddy Edwards
Back to Avalon (Contemporary, 1960 [1995])
With Joe Gordon
Lookin' Good! (Contemporary, 1961)
With Chico Hamilton
Chic Chic Chico (Impulse, 1965)
The Dealer (Impulse!, 1966)
With Gerald Wilson
Portraits (Pacific Jazz, 1964)
The Golden Sword (Pacific Jazz, 1966)

References

1934 births
2018 deaths
American jazz saxophonists
American male saxophonists
Musicians from St. Louis
21st-century American saxophonists
Jazz musicians from Missouri
21st-century American male musicians
American male jazz musicians
20th-century American saxophonists